Bruhns is a German surname. Notable people with the surname include:

 Arthur Bruhns (1874–1928), composer, pianist, and organist
 Birte Bruhns (born 1970), German middle-distance runner
 Friedrich Nicolaus Brauns (1637–1718), German composer and music director
 Júlia da Silva Bruhns (1851–1923), Brazilian wife of German politician Johann Heinrich Mann
 Karl Christian Bruhns (1830–1881), German astronomer
 Nicolaus Bruhns (1665–1697), German organist, violinist, and composer
 Wibke Bruhns (1938–2019), German journalist, television presenter and author
 Annika Bruhns (born 1966), German theater performer

See also 
 5127 Bruhns, main-belt asteroid
 Bruns
 Brauns

German-language surnames